Porphyric hemophilia may refer to:
 Porphyria, a group of diseases in which substances called porphyrins build up
 Vampirism, a term describing being a vampire